The women's discus throw event at the 1959 Summer Universiade was held at the Stadio Comunale di Torino in Turin on 4 September 1959.

Results

References

Athletics at the 1959 Summer Universiade
1959